Roderick Levi Evans is an author, lecturer, bible teacher, and Christian apologist. Evans is the founder of Abundant Truth International Ministries. Evans has written numerous books, articles, blogs, and poetry. His writings focus on orthodox Christianity, evangelical doctrines as well as charismatic/Pentecostal studies. He is best known for his teachings and books on apostolic and prophetic ministries, apologetics, doctrinal studies, as well as leadership. Evans is also a psalmist, singer-songwriter, acoustic guitarist, and poet. He currently resides in Elizabeth City, North Carolina.

Biographical
Roderick L. Evans was born in Boynton Beach, Florida. He was raised in Delray Beach, Florida being the middle child, having one older brother and a younger sister. He describes his early life as challenging. Evans attended Atlantic Community High School and during his junior year of school he became a born again Christian in 1992. He attended the Church of God by Faith located in Delray Beach, Florida. After his conversion, he felt a personal call to ministry and started preaching in 1996. He married Letitia Golf in 2002 and they have one son Seth Elijah Evans.

Ministry
Roderick L. Evans' ministry style is described as forceful and upright. He is known for saying, "Well, while I'm there..." After a move to North Carolina in 1999, he began Kingdom Builders International Ministries in 1999, formally establishing it in 2001. However, in the fall of 2013, he ended Kingdom Builders International and began Abundant Truth International Ministries: a prophetic ministry with an emphasis on Christian apologetics. Aside from his ministry, he is blogger and article writer. He was a featured contributor Revelife.com (an online Christian mag) and writes articles for Hubpages.

Music
Roderick L. Evans is a self-taught guitarist and songwriter. He was inspired to learn how to play the guitar through a dream. Since then, he has written numerous songs for the Christian community, and performing by the name of R.L. Evans with the moniker "Mikhtam Maestro." The focus of his published works is to inspire those in the Christian faith.

Poetry

During a time of illness, he began to write poetry to keep himself motivated. From this, he began to learn different styles and also read and perform poetry. To distinguish this from his ministry, he developed the pen and performing name, "The Refined Poet". His motto for his poetry is "Write to inspire. Write to express. Write to live.”

He describes himself as a poet in this way, "I create poetry under the pseudonym of The Refined Poet due to the style of my writings. I do not write from a place of angst, frustration, or inner turmoil. My poetry comes from biblical, thoughtful introspection and consideration of various topics while respecting the many forms of the poetic genre."

Selected bibliography
 2015 If They Be Prophets: Rediscovering the Ministry of the Prophet in the New Testament Church
 2005 When God Says No: Understanding the Fatherhood of God
 2006 The Prophetic Mantle: The Gift of Prophecy and Prophetic Operations in the Church Today
 2014 The God of Another Chance: Overcoming Your Failures, Possessing Your Divine Destiny
 2009 The Call to Serve: An Examination of the Deacon and Servant's Ministry in the Church
 2010 Precepts for Kingdom Living: Protocols and Perspectives in the Kingdom of God
 2008 The Lazarus Effect: Experiencing a Personal Resurrection

Selected filmography
 2008 Reverence of the Almighty
 2008 First Class Discipleship
 2010 A Force Called Favor
 2014 The Blueprint for a Perfect Church

Selected Sermonic Discography
 2008 What's In a Name?
 2008 Stay in the Ark
 2010 A Force Called Favor
 2010 A Grieving Glory

Music and Spoken Word Discography
 Lamentations of a Poet (Spoken Word)
 Footsteps of Faith (Spoken Word)
 R.L. in Worship... Unplugged, Vol 1

References 

   2. Roderick L. Evans at IMDB

External links 
 Abundant Truth International Ministries
 On D.E.C.K. with Roderick...
 Abundant Truth Publishing
 Mikhtam Musings
 The Poetry Place
 L.O.G.O.S. Apologetics
 Food 4 the Journey

20th-century Protestants
21st-century Protestants
American Christian writers
American Pentecostals
American Charismatics
African-American poets
Christian hymnwriters
American sermon writers
American Christian theologians
American Christian religious leaders
People from Boynton Beach, Florida
Living people
21st-century theologians
Christian apologists
21st-century American poets
People from Elizabeth City, North Carolina
21st-century American non-fiction writers
Year of birth missing (living people)